HMS D1 was one of eight D-class submarine built for the Royal Navy during the first decade of the 20th century.

Description
The D-class submarines were designed as improved and enlarged versions of the preceding C class, with diesel engines replacing the dangerous petrol engines used earlier. They displaced  on the surface and  submerged. The D-class submarines had a crew of 25 officers and ratings and were the first to adopt saddle tanks.

For surface running, the boats were powered by two  diesels, each driving one propeller shaft. When submerged each propeller was driven by a  electric motor. They could reach  on the surface and  underwater.

The boats were armed with three 18-inch (45 cm) torpedo tubes, two in the bow and one in the stern. They carried one reload for each tube, a total of six torpedoes.

Construction and career
D1 was laid down by Vickers on 14 May 1907 and was launched on 16 May 1908 at Barrow. She was commissioned in September 1909. In 1910, D1 took part in the annual manoevures, during which she "torpedoed" two "Blue Fleet" cruisers off Colonsay. This showed that the D class could operate a considerable distance from their base at Fort Blockhouse.

D1 was sunk as a target on 23 October 1918 near Dartmouth.

Wreck discovery 
The wreck was discovered by divers looking for the remains of German U-Boats and has been afforded protected status.

References

External links
 MaritimeQuest HMS D-1 Pages

 

British D-class submarines
Royal Navy ship names
1908 ships
Ships built in Barrow-in-Furness
Ships sunk as targets
Maritime incidents in 1918
Protected Wrecks of England